Cherry Smyth (born 1960) is a London based, Irish academic, poet, writer and art critic

Biography

Cherry Smyth was born Ballymoney, County Antrim, Northern Ireland. She works teaching poetry in Greenwich University's Creative writing department. She had her first collection of poetry published in 2001. She worked on an anthology of women prisoner's writing in 2003 which won the Raymond Williams Community Publishing award. Smyth writes for art magazines including Modern Painters , Art Monthly and Art Review. She is also involved in works on Gender studies.
Criticism of her second collection was positive 

Smyth's third collection, Famished (2019), is a work of documentary poetry which pieces together a history of the Irish Famine. Smyth has performed it in collaboration with the improvisational singer Lauren Kinsella and the musician Ed Bennett throughout Ireland and the UK.

Bibliography
Lesbians Talk: Queer Notions, 1992
Normapaths : Jane and Louise Wilson, 1995
Damn fine art by new lesbian artists, 1996
Mandy McCartin: from the street: paintings and drawings, 1996
Butch/femme: inside lesbian gender, 1998
When the lights go up, 2001
Strong voice in a small space : women writing on the iniside / foreword by Martina Cole ; introduced and edited by Cherry Smyth, 2002
The future of something delicate, 2005
One wanted thing, 2006
Tatton Park Biennial 2012: Flights of Fancy
Test, Orange, 2012
Hold Still, 2013
Famished, 2019
The pleasure threshold: looking at lesbian pornography on film, 1990

References and sources

1953 births
Living people
Academics from Northern Ireland
20th-century women writers from Northern Ireland
21st-century women writers from Northern Ireland